Armand Berton (12 March 1859, Genté - 4 March 1916, Crozant, Creuse) was a French politician.

Initially working as an 'avoué', he then became a farmer in Crozant. A militant radical, he edited the journal La Creuse radicale. He was mayor of Crozant and conseiller d'arrondissement before becoming deputy for Creuse between 1898 and 1902 with the radical-socialist grouping. Beaten in 1902, he became president of the tribunal de première instance in Vigan, then in Tournon and Ancenis.

Sources
"Armand Berton", in Dictionnaire des parlementaires français (1889-1940), Jean Jolly (ed.), PUF, 1960

1859 births
1916 deaths
People from Charente
Politicians from Nouvelle-Aquitaine
Radical Party (France) politicians
Members of the 7th Chamber of Deputies of the French Third Republic